The 2019 BNP Paribas de Nouvelle-Calédonie was a professional tennis tournament played on hard courts. It was the sixteenth edition of the tournament which was part of the 2019 ATP Challenger Tour. It took place in Nouméa, New Caledonia between 31 December 2018 and 6 January 2019.

Singles main-draw entrants

Seeds

1Rankings are as of 24 December 2018.

Other entrants
The following players received wildcards into the singles main draw:
  Geoffrey Blancaneaux
  Maxime Chazal
  Frederik Nielsen
  Hugo Nys
  Rubin Statham

The following players received entry into the singles main draw using their ITF World Tennis Ranking:
  Marcelo Tomás Barrios Vera
  Tobias Simon
  Colin Sinclair
  Tak Khunn Wang

The following players received entry from the qualifying draw:
  André Göransson
  Sem Verbeek

Champions

Singles

 Mikael Ymer def.  Noah Rubin 6–3, 6–3.

Doubles

 Dustin Brown /  Donald Young def.  André Göransson /  Sem Verbeek 7–5, 6–4.

References

External links
Official Website

2019 ATP Challenger Tour
2019
2019 in New Caledonian sport
January 2019 sports events in Oceania
2019 in French tennis